This is a list of most important churches in the State of Palestine:

References 

Churches
Churches in the State of Palestine
Churches